Koluvere may refer to several places in Estonia:

Koluvere, Lääne County, village in Kullamaa Parish, Lääne County
Koluvere Castle
Koluvere, Lääne-Viru County, village in Rakke Parish, Lääne-Viru County